is a passenger railway station located in the Nishitosahage neighborhood of the city of Shimanto, Kōchi Prefecture, Japan. It is operated by JR Shikoku and has the station number "G33".

Lines

Layout
The track runs along a hillside. There is no station building and the station is unstaffed. From the main road, National Route 381, a flight of steps leads up to a single side platform. A shelter is provided for waiting passengers. At the base of the stairs and across the road, there are some parking slots, a bike shed, and a public telephone call box.

Adjacent stations

|-
!colspan=5|JR Shikoku

History
The station opened on 1 March 1974 under the control of Japanese National Railways. After the privatization of JNR on 1 April 1987, control of the station passed to JR Shikoku.

Surrounding area
Shimanto Municipal Honmura Elementary School
Japan National Route 441

See also
 List of railway stations in Japan

References

External links
Station timetable

Railway stations in Kōchi Prefecture
Yodo Line
Railway stations in Japan opened in 1974
Shimanto, Kōchi (city)